A random function – of either one variable (a random process), or two or more variables
(a random field) – is called Gaussian if every finite-dimensional distribution is a multivariate normal distribution. Gaussian random fields on the sphere are useful (for example) when analysing

 the anomalies in the cosmic microwave background radiation (see, pp. 8–9);
 brain images obtained by positron emission tomography (see, pp. 9–10).

Sometimes, a value of a Gaussian random function deviates from its expected value by several standard deviations. This is a large deviation. Though rare in a small domain (of space or/and time), large deviations may be quite usual in a large domain.

Basic statement 
Let  be the maximal value of a Gaussian random function  on the
(two-dimensional) sphere.
The relative error of the approximation decays exponentially for large .

The derivative is random, with zero expectation and some standard deviation. The latter may depend on the point and the direction.

The coefficient  before  is in fact the Euler characteristic of the sphere (for the torus it vanishes).

It is assumed that  is twice continuously differentiable (almost surely), and reaches its maximum at a single point (almost surely).

The clue: mean Euler characteristic 
The clue to the theory sketched above is, Euler characteristic  of the set  of all points  (of the sphere) such that . Its expected value (in other words, mean value)  can be calculated explicitly:

(which is far from being trivial, and involves Poincaré–Hopf theorem, Gauss–Bonnet theorem, Rice's formula etc.).

The set  is the empty set whenever ; in this case . In the other case, when , the set   is non-empty; its Euler characteristic may take various values, depending on the topology of the set (the number of connected components, and possible holes in these components). However, if  is large and  then the set  is usually a small, slightly deformed disk or ellipse (which is easy to guess, but quite difficult to prove).

See also 
 Gaussian process
 Gaussian random field
 Large deviations theory

Further reading 
The basic statement given above is a simple special case of a much more general (and difficult) theory stated by Adler. For a detailed presentation of this special case see Tsirelson's lectures.

Stochastic processes